Kjulaås is a locality situated in Eskilstuna Municipality, Södermanland County, Sweden with 837 inhabitants in 2010.

References 

Populated places in Södermanland County
Populated places in Eskilstuna Municipality